A summit meeting (or just summit) is an international meeting of heads of state or government, usually with considerable media exposure, tight security, and a prearranged agenda. Notable summit meetings include those of Franklin D. Roosevelt, Winston Churchill, and Joseph Stalin during World War II. However, the term summit was not commonly used for such meetings until the Geneva Summit (1955). During the Cold War, when American presidents joined with Soviet or Chinese counterparts for one-on-one meetings, the media labelled the event as a "summit". The post–Cold War era has produced an increase in the number of "summit" events. Nowadays, international summits are the most common expression for global governance.

Notable summits

World War II conferences

U.S.–British Staff Conference (ABC–1) (January 29 – March 27, 1941)
Atlantic Conference (August 9–12, 1941)
Moscow Conference (September 29 – October 1, 1941)
Arcadia Conference (December 22, 1941 – January 14, 1942)
Second Washington Conference (June 20–25, 1942)
Second Moscow Conference (August 12–19, 1942)
Cherchell Conference (October 21–22, 1942)
Casablanca Conference (January 14–24, 1943)
Bermuda Conference (April 19, 1943)
Third Washington Conference (May 12–27, 1943)
Quebec Conference (August 17–24, 1943)
Third Moscow Conference (October 18 – November 1, 1943)
Cairo Conference (November 22–26, 1943)
Tehran Conference (November 28 – December 1, 1943)
Second Cairo Conference (December 4–6, 1943)
Commonwealth Prime Ministers' Conference (May 1–16, 1944)
United Nations Monetary and Financial Conference (Bretton Woods) (July 1–15, 1944)
Dumbarton Oaks Conference (August 21–29, 1944)
Second Quebec Conference (September 12–16, 1944)
Fourth Moscow Conference (October 9, 1944)
Malta Conference (January 30 – February 2, 1945)
Yalta Conference (February 4–11, 1945)
United Nations Conference on International Organization (April 25 – June 26, 1945)
Potsdam Conference (July 17 – August 2, 1945)

Arab League summits

 1974 – Rabat summit conference

 2002 – Beirut Summit

Earth Summits

 1992 – Earth Summit, Rio de Janeiro, Brazil
 2002 – Earth Summit, Johannesburg, South Africa,
 2012 – Earth Summit, Rio de Janeiro, Brazil

G–summits
Group of Six (G6), heads of government
 1975 – 1st G6 summit, Château de Rambouillet

Group of Seven (G7), heads of government

 1976 – 2nd G7 summit, San Juan
 1977 – 3rd G7 summit, London
 1978 – 4th G7 summit, Bonn
 1979 – 5th G7 summit, Tokyo
 1980 – 6th G7 summit, Venice
 1981 – 7th G7 summit, Montebello
 1982 – 8th G7 summit, Versailles
 1983 – 9th G7 summit, Williamsburg
 1984 – 10th G7 summit, London
 1985 – 11th G7 summit, Bonn
 1986 – 12th G7 summit, Tokyo
 1987 – 13th G7 summit, Venice
 1988 – 14th G7 summit, Toronto
 1989 – 15th G7 summit, Grande Arche
 1990 – 16th G7 summit, Houston
 1991 – 17th G7 summit, London
 1992 – 18th G7 summit, Munich
 1993 – 19th G7 summit, Tokyo
 1994 – 20th G7 summit, Naples
 1995 – 21st G7 summit, Halifax
 1996 – 22nd G7 summit, Lyon

Group of Eight (G8), heads of government

 1997 – 23rd G8 summit, Denver
 1998 – 24th G8 summit, Birmingham
 1999 – 25th G8 summit, Cologne
 2000 – 26th G8 summit, Okinawa
 2001 – 27th G8 summit, Genoa
 2002 – 28th G8 summit, Kananaskis
 2003 – 29th G8 summit, Évian-les-Bains
 2004 – 30th G8 summit, Sea Island
 2005 – 31st G8 summit, Gleneagles
 2006 – 32nd G8 summit, Saint Petersburg
 2007 – 33rd G8 summit, Heiligendamm
 2008 – 34th G8 summit, Tōyako
 2009 – 35th G8 summit, L'Aquila, Abruzzo
 2010 – 36th G8 summit, Huntsville
 2011 – 37th G8 summit, Deauville
 2012 – 38th G8 summit, Camp David, Maryland
 2013 – 39th G8 summit, Lough Erne in County Fermanagh

Group of Seven (G7), heads of government

 2014 – 40th G7 summit, Brussels
 2015 – 41st G7 summit, Schloss Elmau, Bavaria
 2016 – 42nd G7 summit, Shima, Mie Prefecture
 2017 – 43rd G7 summit, Taormina, Sicily
 2018 – 44th G7 summit, La Malbaie, Quebec
 2019 – 45th G7 summit, Biarritz, Nouvelle-Aquitaine
 2021 – 47th G7 summit, Cornwall, South West England
 2022 – 48th G7 summit, Schloss Elmau, Bavaria

Group of Twenty, heads of government

 2008 G-20 Washington summit
 2009 G-20 London summit
 2009 G-20 Pittsburgh summit
 2010 G-20 Toronto summit
 2010 G-20 Seoul summit
 2011 G-20 Cannes summit
 2012 G-20 Los Cabos Summit
 2013 G-20 Saint Petersburg summit
 2014 G-20 Brisbane summit
 2015 G-20 Antalya summit
 2016 G-20 Hangzhou summit
 2017 G-20 Hamburg summit
 2018 G-20 Buenos Aires summit
 2019 G-20 Osaka summit
 2020 G-20 Riyadh summit
 2021 G-20 Rome summit
 2022 G-20 Bali summit

European summits

 1969 – The Hague: Foreign policy and enlargement.
 1974 – Paris: Creation of the Council.
 1985 – Milan: Initiate IGC leading to the Single European Act.
 1991 – Maastricht': Agreement on the Maastricht Treaty.
 1997 – Amsterdam: Agreement on the Amsterdam Treaty.
 1998 – Brussels: Selected member states to adopt the euro.

 1999 – Cologne: Declaration on military forces.
 1999 – Tampere: Institutional reform
 2000 – Lisbon: Lisbon Strategy
 2002 – Copenhagen: Agreement for May 2004 enlargement.
 2007 – Lisbon: Agreement on the Lisbon Treaty.

Inter-Korean summits

 2000 – 1st Korean summit
 2007 – 2nd Korean summit

 2018 – April 2018 inter-Korean summit
 2018 – May 2018 inter-Korean summit
 2018 – September 2018 inter-Korean summit

Millennium Development Goals

 2000 – Millennium Summit, New York City

 2005 – 2005 World Summit, New York City

South American Summits

 2000 – 2000 South American Summit, Brasília
 2002 – South American Summit, Guayaquil

 2004 – 2004 South American Summit, Cuzco, Peru

Summits of the Americas

 1994 – 1st Summit of the Americas at Miami in the United States.
 1996—Summit of the Americas on Sustainable Development at Santa Cruz de la Sierra in Bolivia.
 1998 – 2nd Summit of the Americas at Santiago in Chile.
 2001 – 3rd Summit of the Americas, in Quebec City, Canada.

 2004 – Monterrey Special Summit of the Americas at Monterrey in Mexico.
 2005 – 4th Summit of the Americas at Mar del Plata in Argentina.
 2009 – 5th Summit of the Americas at Port-of-Spain in Trinidad and Tobago.
 2012 – 6th Summit of the Americas at Cartagena in Colombia.
 2015 – 7th Summit of the Americas at Panama City in Panama.
 2018 – 8th Summit of the Americas at Lima in Peru.

UN International conferences on Afghanistan

 2001 – International Conference on Afghanistan in Bonn
 2004 – International Conference on Afghanistan in Berlin
 2006 – International Conference on Afghanistan in London
 2007 – International Conference on the Rule of Law in Afghanistan in Rome

 2008 – International Conference on Afghanistan in Paris
 2009 – International Conference on Afghanistan in Moscow
 2009 – International Conference on Afghanistan in The Hague
 2010 – International Conference on Afghanistan in London

Soviet Union–United States summits
 Geneva Summit, July 18–23, 1955
 Washington and Camp David Summit, September 15, 26–27, 1959 
 Paris Summit, May 16–17, 1960 
 Vienna Summit, June 3–4, 1961 
 Glassboro Summit Conference, June 23 and 25, 1967
 Moscow Summit (SALT I), May 22–30, 1972 
 Washington Summit, June 18–25, 1973 
 Moscow summit, June 28 – July 3, 1974 
 Vladivostok Summit Meeting on Arms Control, November 23–24, 1974
 Helsinki summit, July 30 and August 2, 1975 
 Vienna summit (SALT II), June 15–18, 1979 
 Geneva Summit, November 19–21, 1985 
 Reykjavík Summit, October 10–12, 1986
 Washington Summit, December 7–10, 1987
 Moscow Summit, May 29 – June 1, 1988 
 New York Summit, December 7, 1988 
 Malta Summit, December 2–3, 1989
 Washington D.C., May 30 – June 3, 1990 
 Helsinki Summit, September 9, 1990 
 Paris Summit, November 19, 1990
 London Summit, July 17, 1991
 Moscow Summit (START I), July 30–31, 1991 
 Madrid Summit, October 29–30, 1991

Russia–United States summits

 2001 – Slovenia Summit 2001
 2005 – Slovakia Summit 2005

 2018 – Russia–United States summit
 2021 – Russia–United States summit

Miscellaneous

 1520 – Field of the Cloth of Gold
 1955 – Geneva Summit
 1967 – Glassboro Summit Conference
 1985 – Shamrock Summit
 1986 – Reykjavík Summit
 1989 – Malta Summit
 1990 – World Summit for Children
 2001 – Agra summit
 2001 – Taba summit
 2000 – 2000 Camp David Summit
 2003–2005 – World Summit on the Information Society
 2005 – Sharm el-Sheikh Summit of 2005
 2015 – Valletta Summit on Migration
 2017 – 2017 Riyadh summit
 2018 – 2018 North Korea–United States Singapore Summit
 2019 – 2019 North Korea–United States Hanoi Summit

See also 
 ASEAN summit
 
 Francophonie Summits
 NATO summit
 Non-Aligned Movement Summits
 SAARC Summits
Global safety summit  GSS

References

Diplomacy